The Fiat Tipo (Type 160) is a compact car, designed by the I.DE.A Institute design house, and produced by the Italian manufacturer Fiat between 1988 and 1995.

The Tipo was initially available only as a five-door hatchback. The car was made entirely out of galvanized body panels to avoid rust, and was built on a completely new Fiat platform, which was later also used in Alfa Romeo and Lancia models.

It also stood out because of its boxy styling that gave it innovative levels of packaging, rear passenger room being greater than that in a rear wheel drive Ford Sierra, but in a car that was of a similar size to the smaller Ford Escort. This type of design was comparable to the smaller Fiat Uno, which was launched five years before the Tipo.

In 1989, the Tipo won the European Car of the Year award and the 1989 Semperit Irish Car of the Year in Ireland. The car was extremely popular in Brazil. It outsold the Volkswagen Gol, which had been the best selling Brazilian car for more than twenty years. Only the Tipo, the Fiat Uno Mille, and Fiat Palio have ever outsold the Gol as well.

Variants

Unveiled in January 1988, the Tipo went on sale in Europe during June 1988, and on the right hand drive market in the United Kingdom from 16 July 1988, initially base (i.e.), DGT, (early Italian market DGT models were badged as 'digit', presumably in recognition of the digital dash,  but this was quickly changed to DGT after a dispute over ownership of the name, leading to confusion about whether the model was diesel powered) S, SX and 16v trim levels were available. "Tipo" is Italian for "type".

Power from  came from 1.1, 1.4, 1.6, 1.7, 1.8, 1.8 16v, 2.0, and 2.0 16v petrol engines, as well as a 1.7 diesel, 1.9 diesel, and 1.9 turbodiesel.

The 1.1 base engine was widely regarded as underpowered for the car, which was otherwise roomy for five adults and with above average equipment. This version was never sold in the United Kingdom. The top of the range was the 2.0 Sedicivalvole (16 valves).

The market in the United Kingdom initially received only the 1.4 and 1.6 versions of the Tipo, with the 1.8 and 2.0 petrol engines and the diesel powered units not being imported until the beginning of the 1990s.

The smaller Uno had been a huge success there during the 1980s (peaking at more than 40,000 sales in 1988) and it was widely expected by both Fiat and by the motoring press that the Tipo would prove similarly successful, but sales ultimately fell below expectations.

The Tipo was facelifted in 1993, and a three-door version was added, as well as minor exterior changes (the two evolutions of the car can be differentiated by their slightly different radiator grilles and headlamps) and improved specifications; safety features like stiffer bodyshells, driver's airbag, and side impact bars were added to the range. This included the new S, SX, and SLX trim levels, as well as a new eight valve 2.0 GT model.

The Tipo ceased production in the summer of 1995, and was replaced by the three door Fiat Bravo and five door Fiat Brava. The Tempra saloon and estate (station wagon) were replaced by the Marea. The Bravo and Brava were strong sellers throughout Europe, but the Marea was a disappointment in most markets.

It was a reasonably strong seller in the United Kingdom, initially winning plaudits for its innovative and practical design, as well as its good handling. It was originally sold with only 1.4 and 1.6 petrol engines, although the 16 valve 1.8 and 2.0 engines with fuel injection became available there in the early 1990s.

The digital dashboard of higher end models proved to be controversial and unreliable.

The car launched into a favourable market in the United Kingdom, where none of the "big three" carmakers (Ford, Vauxhall, and Austin Rover) had launched an all new car of this size for at least four years. However, these three marques all had new Tipo sized products within three years, and increased competition reduced the Tipo's sales.

Its fortunes outside Italy also suffered in the beginning of the 1990s, as it was launched around the same time as France's Renault 19, and was soon followed by host of other new rivals, including the Citroën ZX.

The final two years (1994 and 1995) saw a significant increase in sales, but these were mostly of the low priced 1.4 litre models.

Production elsewhere
In Brazil, it only started to be produced in 1995, in a single trim level. It had a 1.6 litre, eight valve engine with multipoint fuel injection, which offered a  increase compared to the old 1.6 litre i.e., producing .

Previously, the Tipo had been imported from Italy and was available with three different trims that were closely associated with its engines: the basic 1.6 i.e., the luxurious 2.0 litre (eight valve), and the sporty two litre, sixteen valve Sedicivalvole. Seventeen 1.7 litre models were also brought in; they are all in Estoril Blue color and received complete equipment.

It was also built in Turkey, by Tofaş. The Turkish built cars generally did not feature catalytic converters and some thus have marginally more power than the models listed in the table beneath. The Turkish cars also have a small "Tofaş" logo on the left side of the bootlid, and production there continued at least until 2000.

Petrol

Diesel

Derivatives
The Tipo platform spawned nine more cars. The first of these was the Yugo Sana/Zastava Florida in November 1988, followed by the Lancia Dedra sedan in April 1989 and the Fiat Tempra in February 1990. The large family car Alfa Romeo 155, the coupé Fiat Coupé and the Lancia Delta Nuova were all introduced in 1993, and were also built on the Tipo platform, as were the Alfa Romeo 145 and 146 and the Alfa Romeo Spider and GTV (with a different rear suspension and other chassis refinements) from 1994 to 1995.

References

External links 
 
 History of the Fiat Tipo
 Fiat Tipo (2016) walkaround (YouTube)

Tipo
Compact cars
Front-wheel-drive vehicles
1980s cars
1990s cars
Cars introduced in 1988
Vehicles with CVT transmission
Cars of Turkey
Cars of Brazil
Cars discontinued in 2000